The 2021 Biathlon Junior World Championships were held from 27 February to 6 March 2021 in Obertilliach, Austria.

Schedule
All times are local (UTC+1).

Results

Junior events

Junior Men

Junior Women

Youth events

Youth Men

Youth Women

Medal table

References

Biathlon Junior World Championships
Junior World
Biathlon competitions in Austria
2021 in youth sport
Sport in Tyrol (state)
February 2021 sports events in Austria
March 2021 sports events in Austria